The Victor Gollancz Prize is an international human rights prize awarded by the Society for Threatened Peoples. It is named for British humanitarian Sir Victor Gollancz.

The prize is awarded in Göttingen.

Laureates

2000 The society Mothers of Srebrenica and Zepa, Bosnia-Hercegovina, for their work to identify the victims of the Srebrenica Genocide
2001 Zainap Gaschajewa and Lipkan Basajewa, Chechnya, for their humanitarian work and documenting of crimes in Chechnya
2003 The Society of Former Female Bosnian Concentration Camp Prisoners, Bosnia-Hercegovina, for their humanitarian work for the survivors of the Serb concentration camps and organized war rape campaigns, and the Widows of Barzan-Tal, Iraq, for their work for the families of the victims of the Barzan-Tal massacre
2004 Libkan Basaeva, Chechnya
2005 Sergei Kovalev, Russia, for his documenting of Russian crimes in Chechnya and his work within the Memorial organization, and Mustafa Dzhemilev, for his work for the Crimean Tatars
2008: Halima Bashir, West Sudan/Darfur, for her work for the people of Darfur, and Jovan Divjak, for humanitarian work for children in Sarajevo
2009 Memorial, Russia
2014 Bernard Kouchner, former French foreign minister and co-founder of Doctors without Borders, in recognition of his "lifelong, unwavering commitment to fight crimes against humanity"

References

Peace awards
Human rights awards